Mukim Batu Apoi is a mukim in Temburong District, Brunei.

Name 
The mukim is named after Kampong Batu Apoi, one of the villages it encompasses.

Geography 
The mukim is located in the east of the Temburong District to the centre, bordering Mukim Labu to the north, the Malaysian state of Sarawak to the east, Mukim Amo to the south and Mukim Bangar to the west.

Demographics 
As of 2016 census, the population was 1,635 with  males and  females. The mukim had 294 households occupying 279 dwellings. The entire population lived in rural areas.

Villages 
As of 2016, the mukim comprised the following census villages:

Notes

References 

Batu Apoi
Temburong District